Janette Steer (3 July 1863 – 24 November 1947) was an actress, playwright, theatrical manager, and suffragist based in London.

Early life 
Born Janet Gertrude Trevor Steer in Calcutta, India, 3rd July 1863, she was the youngest daughter of Charles Steer (1811–1888) who served in the Indian Civil Service, and his Irish-born second wife Janet Ann Wetherall (1820–1889).

Career 
Janette Steer began acting as an amateur, with her sister, Mrs. Mackintosh. An early reviewer described the two in 1886: "Mrs. Mackintosh is tall and stout; Miss Steer is tall and thin. Mrs. Mackintosh has a good deal of hard voice; Miss Steer has very little voice at all. Mrs. Mackintosh has some faint glimmerings of histrionic ability; Miss Steer at present has none. They were cheered by their friends, and received bouquets." However, it was Steer who continued in the profession.

In 1900, Steer became manager of the Comedy Theatre. She accepted the role because, as she explained, "I hate having to play parts I don't like, and now I can choose what I please." That year, she appeared in a set of four short works, including W. S. Gilbert's Comedy and Tragedy, Alicia Ramsey's Isla the Chosen, and scenes from Romeo and Juliet (she played Romeo) and Hamlet (she played Hamlet). Steer provoked widely publicized threats of legal action from W. S. Gilbert, when Gilbert was upset by her interpretation of Galatea, at odds with his conception of the character, in a 1900 revival of his Pygmalion and Galatea. A court refused to grant an injunction against Steer in the matter.

Other acting appearances by Steer included the shows Robinson Crusoe (1886, with her sister Mrs. Mackintosh), Idols of the Heart (1891, a play she wrote and acted in), An American Bride (1892), Gudgeons (1893), The Silent Battle (1892-1893), A Bunch of Violets (1894), John-a-Dreams (1894), The Seats of the Mighty (1897), Settled Out of Court (1897), The Liars (1897), Kenyon's Widow (1900), The Sin of a Life (1901), The Queen's Double (1901),  A Pageant of Great Women (1909-1910), Edith (1912, produced by the Women Writers' Suffrage League), Honourable Women (1913), and The Sphinx (1914, another suffrage play, which she also wrote), The End of Silence (1915, a wartime fundraiser for the RSPCA), and The Passing of the Third Floor Back (1917, a wartime fundraiser for Scottish Women's Hospitals).  

Plays written by Steer included The Cloven Foot (1890), Idols of the Heart (1890), All Sorts and Conditions of Men (1902), Geraldine Wants to Know (1911), and The Sphinx (1914).  Steer was a member of the Actresses' Franchise League and wrote an essay "The Suffrage Movement and the Salvation of the Race" for a 1912 suffrage publication.

Personal life 
Steer lived in England and died 1947 in Henley, Oxfordshire.

References

1863 births
1947 deaths
British actresses
British dramatists and playwrights
British suffragists